Alfred M. Cook (October 4, 1850 – January 30, 1921) was an American farmer, businessman, and politician.

Born in Lloydtown, Ontario, Canada, Cook moved with parents to Calumet County, Wisconsin and went to high school in Fond du Lac, Wisconsin. He moved to Unity, Wisconsin and was a farmer and in the lumber business. He served as chairman of the Brighton, Wisconsin Town Board and as director of the local high school in Unity. Cook was the postmaster in Unity. In 1901, Cook served in the Wisconsin State Assembly and was a Republican. He died in Marshfield, Wisconsin on January 30, 1921.

Notes

1850 births
1921 deaths
People from King, Ontario
People from Calumet County, Wisconsin
People from Unity, Wisconsin
Pre-Confederation Canadian emigrants to the United States
Businesspeople from Wisconsin
Farmers from Wisconsin
Mayors of places in Wisconsin
School board members in Wisconsin
Republican Party members of the Wisconsin State Assembly